This is a list of minerals which have Wikipedia articles.

Minerals are distinguished by various chemical and physical properties. Differences in chemical composition and crystal structure distinguish the various species. Within a mineral species there may be variation in physical properties or minor amounts of impurities that are recognized by mineralogists or wider society as a mineral variety.

Mineral variety names are listed after the valid minerals for each letter.

For a more complete listing of all mineral names, see List of minerals recognized by the International Mineralogical Association.

A

Varieties that are not valid species:
Adamantine spar (variety of corundum)
Agate (variety of chalcedony and quartz)
Alabaster (variety of gypsum)
Alexandrite (variety of chrysoberyl)
Allingite (synonym of amber)
Alum
Amazonite (variety of microcline)
Amethyst (purple variety of quartz)
Ametrine (variety of quartz)
Ammolite (organic; also a gemstone)
Amosite (asbestiform grunerite)
Antozonite (variety of fluorite)
Anyolite (metamorphic rock - zoisite, ruby, and hornblende)
Aquamarine (light blue variety of beryl)
Argentite (high temperature form of acanthite)
Asbestos (fibrous serpentine- or amphibole minerals)
Auerlite (variety of thorite)
Avalite (chromian variety of illite)
Aventurine (variety of quartz)

B

Varieties that are not valid species:
Barbertonite (polytype of stichtite)
Bauxite (aluminium ore)
Beckerite (natural resin)
Bentonite (mixture of montmorillonite and other clays)
Bixbite (red gem variety of beryl)
Bowenite (variety of antigorite)
Brammallite (variety of illite)
Brokenhillite (not approved by IMA)
Buergerite (renamed to fluor-buergerite)
Bursaite (not approved by IMA)
Bytownite (variety of anorthite)

C

Varieties that are not valid species:
Campylite (variety of mimetite)
Carnelian (variety of quartz)
Cementite (synthetic cohenite)
Ceylonite (variety of spinel)
Chalcedony (cryptocrystalline variety of quartz and moganite)
Chiastolite (variety of andalusite)
Chlorastrolite (variety of pumpellyite-(Mg))
Chrysoprase (green nickel bearing chalcedony)
Chrysotile (group name - asbestiform serpentine)
Citrine (yellow variety of quartz)
Cleveite (variety of uraninite)
Clinochrysotile (polytype of chrysotile)
Coltan (short for minerals of the columbite group)
Crocidolite (asbestiform riebeckite)
Cymophane (variety of chrysoberyl)

D

Varieties that are not valid species:
Delessite (magnesian chamosite)
Diallage (a junction between augite and diopside)

E

Varieties that are not valid species:
Elsmoreite (pure hydrokenoelsmoreite)
Emerald (green gem variety of beryl)

F
 

Varieties that are not valid species:
Fassaite (variety of augite)
Ferrocolumbite (synonym of columbite-(Fe))
Ferrotantalite (synonym of tantalite-(Fe))
Fluorspar (synonym of fluorite)
Francolite (variety of fluorapatite)

G

Varieties that are not valid species:
Garnierite (a nickel ore)
Gedanite (fossilized resin)
Glessite (natural resin)
Goshenite (colorless variety of beryl)

H

Varieties that are not valid species:
Hatchettite (a paraffin wax)
Heliodor (greenish-yellow variety of beryl)
Heliotrope (variety of chalcedony)
Hessonite (variety of grossular)
Hiddenite (variety of spodumene)
Hyalite (variety of opal)
Hyalophane (synonym of jaloallofane) 
Hypersthene (synonym of enstatite or ferrosilite, or mid-way member of the enstatite–ferrosilite series) (not approved by IMA)

I

Varieties that are not valid species:
Idocrase (synonym of vesuvianite)
Iolite (a gem-quality variety of cordierite)

J

Varieties that are not valid species:
Jade (tough, green mineral either jadeite or nephrite amphibole)
Jasper (variety of quartz)
Jeffersonite (variety of augite)

K

Varieties that are not valid species:
Keilhauite (variety of titanite)
Kerolite (variety of talc) (not approved by IMA)
Krantzite (natural resin)
Kunzite (variety of spodumene)

L

Varieties that are not valid species:
Larimar (blue variety of pectolite)
Lignite (a type of coal)
Lodestone (a synonym of magnetite)
Lublinite (variety of calcite)

M

Varieties that are not valid species:
Magnesia 
Magnesiocummingtonite (magnesium-rich variety of cummingtonite)
Malacolite (synonym of diopside)
Manganocolumbite (synonym of columbite-(Mn))
Manganotantalite (synonym of tantalite-(Mn))
Mariposite (variety of phengite/muscovite)
Meerschaum (variety of sepiolite)
Melanite (variety of andradite)
Menilite (variety of opal)
Milky quartz (a cloudy white quartz)
Morganite (a pink beryl)

N

Varieties that are not valid species:
Nephrite (variety of tremolite/actinolite)
Niobite (synonym of columbite)
Niobite-tantalite (synonym of columbite-tantalite)

O

Varieties that are not valid species:
Oligoclase (a mixture of albite and anorthite)
Onyx (a monochromatic banded variety of chalcedony)
Orthochrysotile (a polytype of chrysotile)

P

Varieties that are not valid species:
Parachrysotile (a polytype of chrysotile)
Pelagosite (variety of aragonite)
Pericline (variety of albite)
Peridot (gem-quality olivine)
Perlite (volcanic glass)
Phengite (variety of muscovite)
Phosphorite (name given to impure, massive apatite.)
Pimelite (not approved by IMA)
Pitchblende (a massive impure form of uraninite)
Plessite (mixture of kamacite and taenite)
Potassium alum or potash alum (as a mineral, is called alum-(K))

Q

R

Varieties that are not valid species:
Rashleighite (variety of turquoise)
Rhodolite (variety of pyrope)
Rock crystal (quartz)
Rose quartz (pink variety of quartz)
Roumanite (amber)
Ruby (red gem corundum)

S

Varieties that are not valid species:
Sapphire (gem corundum of any color except red, especially blue varieties)
Sard (a variety of chalcedony/quartz)
Satinspar (a variety of gypsum)
Selenite (a variety of gypsum)
Simetite (a variety of amber)
Smoky quartz (a brown or black variety of quartz)
Soda niter (synonym of nitratine)
Spectrolite (a variety of labradorite)
Spessartite (synonym of spessartine)
Sphene (synonym of titanite)
Stantienite (a variety of amber)
Stibiconite (grandfathered by IMA)
Sunstone (a variety of either oligoclase or orthoclase)

T

Varieties that are not valid species:
Tanzanite (variety of zoisite)
Thulite (variety of zoisite)
Thuringite (variety of chamosite)
Travertine (form of calcium carbonate)
Tsavorite (gem variety of grossularite garnet)

U

V

W

X

Y
 

Varieties that are not valid species:
Yttrocerite (variety of fluorite)
Yttrocolumbite (variety of columbite)

Z

Varieties that are not valid species:
Zajacite-(Ce) (name changed to gagarinite-(Ce))
Zhonghuacerite-(Ce) (considered to be kukharenkoite-(Ce) or huanghoite-(Ce))
Zinalsite (synonym of fraipontite)

See also 

 
 
 
 
 
 
 
 
 
 
 List of minerals named after people
 
 
 
 
 Timeline of the discovery and classification of minerals

External links 

 Mineralatlas.eu - The mineralogical and geological database
 Mindat.org – The Mineral Database
 Gemdat.org – The Gemstone Database
 Gemsociety.org - Gemstone Toxicity Table

 List01
List01
Minerals01